Rompiendo Fronteras ("Breaking borders") is the name of the fifteenth studio album by Mexican singer Alejandro Fernández. It was released on February 10, 2017 under the Universal Music Group label. The album, Fernández's first in four years, combines the traditional sounds from his earliest repertoire with Latin pop, in particular the collaboration with Colombian band Morat. The album also featured Mexican songwriters Mario Domm and Leonel García. According to AMPROFON, the album sold 60,000 copies in its first week in Mexico, thus certifying it platinum.

Track listing

CD

Charts

Weekly charts

Year-end charts

Certifications

References

2017 albums
Alejandro Fernández albums